Melem-Kish of Kish was the sixteenth Sumerian king in the First Dynasty of Kish, according to the Sumerian King List. His father was En-me-nuna, whom he succeeded as ruler. The kings on the early part of the SKL are usually not considered historical, except when they are mentioned in Early Dynastic documents. Melem-Kish is not one of them.

References 

|-

Kings of Kish
Sumerian kings